General Sir Reginald Alexander Dallas Brooks,  (22 August 1896 – 22 March 1966) was a British military commander who went on to become the 19th and longest-serving governor of Victoria, Australia.

Early life
Brooks was born on 22 August 1896 at Cambridge, Cambridgeshire, son of Dallas George Brooks and Violet Ruth, née Shepherd. He was an only child.

Brooks was educated at Dover College and joined the Royal Marines in 1914. During the First World War he was severely wounded during the Gallipoli landings in 1915. He took part in the Zeebrugge Raid in 1918, for which he was awarded a Distinguished Service Order.

Cricketing career
Upon returning from war, Brooks made his first-class debut for the Royal Navy against Cambridge University in 1919 as a right-handed batsman who bowled right-arm medium. The same season he made his debut for Hampshire against Surrey in the County Championship. Brooks represented Hampshire eight times in the 1919, making his maiden first-class century against Gloucestershire with a score of 107.

Brooks represented Hampshire in nine first-class matches between 1919 and 1921, with his final first-class appearance for the county coming against Middlesex. He scored 244 runs for Hampshire at a batting average of 16.26, with one century and one half century and a high score of 107.

In 1920 Brooks made his second first-class century, this time for the Royal Navy against the Army, which gave him his highest first-class score of 143. He played as an all-rounder for the Royal Navy, a role he did not fill at Hampshire.

In all, Brooks represented the Royal Navy in sixteen first-class matches, with his final appearance for them coming against the Royal Air Force in 1929. In his sixteen matches for the Royal Navy, Brooks scored 690 runs at a batting average of 23.00, with one century and two half centuries and a highest score of 143. With the ball he took 38 wickets at a bowling average of 27.63, with one five wicket haul which gave him his career best figures of 8/90.

Additionally, Brooks represented the Combined Services with four first-class matches.

Military career
Brooks graduated from the Royal Navy Staff College in 1934, and from 1943 served as Director-General (Military) of the Political Warfare Executive. In 1946 he was appointed Commandant General Royal Marines in the rank of lieutenant general. He was promoted to general in 1948, knighted that year, and retired in May 1949.

Governor of Victoria
Brooks was appointed Governor of Victoria by Premier Thomas Hollway and served from 1949 to 1963. During his term as governor, he acted as Administrator of the Commonwealth three times. He served in this capacity for almost seven months after the governor-general, Viscount Dunrossil, suddenly died in office in 1961 after serving only one year. Sir Dallas was in effect Acting governor-general until the appointment of the Viscount De L'Isle.

Brooks served the state for over 13 years, becoming Victoria's longest-serving governor. After his term ended in 1963, he chose to remain in Australia in retirement. He built a house in Frankston and died there three years later.

Freemasonry
Brooks was Grand Master of the United Grand Lodge of Victoria (Masonic Lodge or Freemasons) from 1951 to 1963. He was Victoria's longest serving Grand Master, and he is the only governor of any Australian state initiated to the craft while serving as governor. Brooks had expressed a desire to become a freemason while in England but he had also stated that he preferred to become initiated in Australia. He met with the Grand Master of Victoria and notified him. He was initiated in the Clarke Lodge No. 98 on 6 February 1950 and was passed and raised within two months. He became Worshipful Master of the Lodge only five months after his initiation and he was elected Grand Master of the Grand Lodge of Victoria the following year.

Legacy

In 1969 the United Grand Lodge of Victoria built a concert hall in East Melbourne. The Hall was renamed in 1993 from the Dallas Brooks Hall to the Dallas Brooks Centre and was a major events venue in Melbourne until 2016 when it was demolished to build an apartment complex.

The Melbourne suburb of Dallas was named after Sir Dallas, as well as Dallas Brooks Drive in Kings Domain. The official residence of the governor of Victoria, Government House, is located on the corner of Birdwood Avenue and Dallas Brooks Drive.

Brooks was the grandfather of journalist and television presenter Jennifer Byrne.

Members of the organisation of Scouts Australia, Sir Dallas Brooks Rover Crew, also adopted the name of the General.

References

External links
Reginald Brooks at Cricinfo
Reginald Brooks at CricketArchive
Matches and detailed statistics for Reginald Brooks
Generals of World War II
Royal Marine Officers 1939−1945

|-

1896 births
1966 deaths
Australian Freemasons
Combined Services cricketers
Companions of the Distinguished Service Order
English cricketers
Governors of Victoria (Australia)
Hampshire cricketers
Knights Commander of the Order of the Bath
Knights Commander of the Royal Victorian Order
Knights Grand Cross of the Order of St Michael and St George
Knights of the Order of St John
Masonic Grand Masters
People educated at Dover College
People from Cambridge
Recipients of the Croix de Guerre 1914–1918 (France)
Royal Marines generals of World War II
Royal Marines personnel of World War I
Royal Navy cricketers
Foreign Office personnel of World War II
Royal Marines generals
Graduates of the Royal Naval College, Greenwich
Military personnel from Cambridgeshire
English emigrants to Australia